Clooney is a civil parish of County Clare, Ireland, located to the northeast of Ennis, south of Inchicronan. The area is marshy, with the Oysterman's Marsh Natural Heritage Area in the vicinity. Clooney-Quin GAA is a GAA club for the Catholic parish of Clooney and Quin.

Geography
The civil parish of Clooney is in the barony of Bunratty Upper.
It is situated in the central part of the county and is bordered by Inchicronan to the north,  Tulla to the east, Quin to the south, Doora to the southwest, and Kilraghtis to the west. It is divided into 25 townlands:
  

Ballycrighan 	
Ballyhickey 
Ballyvergin 
Ballyvroghaun Eighter
Ballyvroghaun Oughter
Caherloghan
Cahershaughnessy
Carrahan
Clooney
Corbally 
Cranagher 
Curraghmoghaun
Derrycalliff 
Feenagh 
Kilgobban 
Knockanoura
Knockaphreaghaun 
Lassana 	
Maghera 
Moyriesk
Muckinish 
Rathclooney 
Rylane 	
Sraheen
Toonagh

See also
List of townlands of County Clare

References

Civil parishes of County Clare